Bhopal Uttar Assembly constituency is one of the 230 assembly constituencies of Madhya Pradesh. It comes under Bhopal district.

Members of the Legislative Assembly

Election Results

2018 results

References

http://www.mapsofindia.com/parliamentaryconstituencies/madhyapradesh/bhopal.htm&sa=U&ved=0ahUKEwjYnKG6lqzTAhUBOI8KHVYMBY8QFggOMBE&usg=AFQjCNE_9FMWV6exzEuWMtWJmambOV2ssA
http://timesofindia.indiatimes.com/city/bhopal/Arif-Aqueel-pitches-in-for-minority-face-as-leader-of-oppositio/articleshow/55279775.cms

Assembly constituencies of Madhya Pradesh
Bhopal district